Cladonia fimbriata or the trumpet cup lichen is a species cup lichen belonging to the family Cladoniaceae.

As of July 2021, its conservation status has not been estimated by the IUCN. In Iceland, its conservation status is denoted as data deficient (DD).

See also
List of Cladonia species

References

Lichens described in 1753
fimbriata
Lichen species
Taxa named by Carl Linnaeus